Anurag Basu (born 8 May 1970) is an Indian director, screenwriter, actor and producer. He began his directing career in television, moving to feature films in 2002. Basu achieved initial success with his films tackling the themes of passion and adultery such as Life in a... Metro, Kites, Gangster and Murder. Later, he directed comedy-drama films such as the critically acclaimed and commercially successful Barfi! along with the commercially unsuccessful Jagga Jasoos. His latest work is a black comedy Netflix film Ludo.

Early life
Basu was born into an upper-middle-class Bengali family in Bhilai, Madhya Pradesh (now in Chhattisgarh). His parents, Subrato Bose and Deepshikha Bose (ex-executives in SAIL Bhilai Steel Plant in Cokeovens and Education department (Organic Chemistry) respectively), were award-winning theatrical artists and Basu grew up watching them performing in his father's theatre company (Abhiyaan). He attended BSP Senior Secondary School, Sector-IV (SSS-IV) in Bhilai, Chhattisgarh (then Madhya Pradesh). He received a B.Sc. degree in Physics honours from the University of Mumbai, intending to study cinematography at FTII, Pune; however, during his college years in Mumbai he had an opportunity to assist on a number of levels in TV and film projects. After trying to remain involved with filmmaking, Basu became an assistant director to Raman Kumar on Tara.

Career

Television
Basu began his television career as an assistant director on Tara in mid 1994. After six months, he was given full responsibility for directing about 712 episodes. He directed television serials, trying genres ranging from daily soaps to thrillers such as Saturday Suspense and Ajeeb Dastaan, and horror (X-Zone). Basu's most successful work during this period was the Balaji Telefilms soap Koshish ...Ek Aashaa in 2000 and he made pilot episodes of Indian television shows including Kyun ki saans bhi kabhi bahu thi, Kahani ghar ghar ki and Kasouti zindagi ki in 2001 and 2002. He began his own company and initially he produced TV serials for Zee TV and Sony channel. The popular shows of his company were Manzilien Apni Apni, Miit, Thriller at Ten, and  Horror Shows on Zee. He himself directed the TV series Miit (based on the novel Noukadubi by Rabindranath Tagore), Manzilien Apni Apni and all his other series. Basu has directed many television shows. In 2000 he received a RAPA Award for Best Director Award from the Radio and TV Advertisers Practitioners Association, followed by an Aashirwad Award for Best Director two years later. Basu returned to television in 2007 to produce and direct the college drama Love Story and hosted the Bengali reality show Ke Hobe Biggest Fan (Who Will Be the Biggest Fan) for Zee Bangla in 2010. Basu started his own film production house, Ishana Movies, in 2007 and the first film of his production company was the 2007 musical drama film Life in a... Metro with co-producer UTV. Currently his series Stories by Rabindranath Tagore is airing on Netflix and EPIC Channel. Basu will be judging the upcoming TV show 'Super Dancer Chapter 4', along with Shilpa Shetty and Geeta Kapoor.

Films

From his first job in films as an extra actor (Dalaal 1993) to his first film as director, it was a journey of nearly eleven years. His first film was the mystery-drama Saaya for Mahesh Bhatt's production company, Vishesh Films, starring John Abraham and Tara Sharma, which failed at the box office and was panned by critics for its loose screenplay.

Basu's second film was 2004's Murder. The film dealt with adultery and contained sex scenes, unusual for Indian cinema. Despite its "A" certificate from the Central Board of Film Certification, it was well received by critics, who appreciated performances by Mallika Sherawat, Emraan Hashmi and Ashmit Patel.  Basu's next movie was Gangster, in which he first collaborated with Pritam (who later scored Life in a... Metro). He was diagnosed with acute leukemia in 2004, halfway through Tumsa Nahin Dekha. Basu was immediately hospitalised, directing parts of the film from his hospital bed. He gave instructions by dictaphone for camera angles and script changes, with Mahesh Bhatt and Mohit Suri completing the film while the director underwent chemotherapy.

His next film was 2010's Kites, starring Hrithik Roshan, Bárbara Mori and Kangana Ranaut.

In 2012 Basu's film Barfi!, starring Ranbir Kapoor, Priyanka Chopra and Ileana D'Cruz, opened to largely-positive reviews and was well received at the Busan International Film Festival. Barfi! was selected for the Taipei and Morocco film festivals. Barfi won the prestigious Grand Jury Award at Okinawa International Film Festival in Japan. It was India's entry for the Academy Awards, but was criticized after Basu was accused of plagiarizing several Hollywood films.  It was a box-office hit during its opening week, earning Rs. 586 million, and was the third-highest-grossing film that year.

His thriller film Jagga Jasoos was shot in Cape Town, South Africa. Originally planned for a release in 2014, schedule conflicts set back release. The film was produced by Basu and Ranbir Kapoor's new production company (Picture Shuru Entertainment) in association with Disney Studios. Ranbir Kapoor, Priyanka Chopra, Katrina Kaif and Alia Bhatt were under consideration for lead roles. Reports from Cape Town were that the real-world romance of leads Ranbir Kapoor and Katrina Kaif and occasional arguments between the two caused some delays and resulted in scenes not having the import intended by director Anurag Basu.  By 20 March 2014, the director had completed 20 days of filming with his leads and, being unhappy with initial efforts by actor Ranbir Kapoor, used the additional schedule time to re-shoot some scenes. Due to the reshoots, the film was not released until 2017. His latest film as a director is Ludo (2020).

Personal life
Basu is married to Tani Basu and has two daughters, Ishana (b. 2004) and Ahana (b. 2007).

Filmography

Films

Frequent collaborations 

Television
Tara (1996)
Saturday Suspense (1998)
 Star Best Sellers (1999)
 X-Zone (1999)
Ajeeb Dastaan (1998)
Koshish ...Ek Aashaa (2000)
 Kyun Ki Saans Bhi Kabhi Bahu Thi 
 Kahani Ghar Ghar Ki (2000)
Manzilien Apni Apni (TV series) (2001) - Home production
Miit (2002) - Home production
Thriller at 10 (2005–2006) - Home Production
Ke Hobe Biggest Fan (2010)
Rooh - Home Production
Love Story (2007) - Home Production
Stories by Rabindranath Tagore (2015) - Home Production
Super Dancer As a Judge (Season 1-4) - (2016-2021)

Awards and nominations

References

External links 

 
 

21st-century Indian film directors
Hindi-language film directors
Indian television directors
Living people
Filmfare Awards winners
Screen Awards winners
Bengali film directors
Film directors from West Bengal
People from Bhilai
1974 births
International Indian Film Academy Awards winners
Zee Cine Awards winners